Lúč na Ostrove is a village and municipality in the Dunajská Streda District in the Trnava Region of south-west Slovakia.

Component villages

Geography
The municipality lies at an altitude of 118 metres and covers an area of 15.890 km².

History
In the 9th century, the territory of Lúč na Ostrove became part of the Kingdom of Hungary. The name of the village was first recorded in 1248 as Luche. Until the end of World War I, the villages forming the present-day municipality were part of Hungary and fell within the Dunaszerdahely district of Pozsony County. After the Austro-Hungarian army disintegrated in November 1918, Czechoslovak troops occupied the area. After the Treaty of Trianon of 1920, the villages became officially part of Czechoslovakia. In November 1938, the First Vienna Award granted the area to Hungary and it was held by Hungary until 1945. After Soviet occupation in 1945, Czechoslovak administration returned and the village became officially part of Czechoslovakia in 1947. The present-day municipality was formed from its two component villages in 1960.

Demography 
At the 2001 Census the recorded population of the village was 736 while an end-2008 estimate by the Statistical Office had the villages's population as 788. As of 2001, 95.65% of its population were Hungarians while 3.80% were Slovaks. Roman Catholicism is the majority religion of the village, its adherents numbering 97.01% of the total population.

References 

Villages and municipalities in Dunajská Streda District
Hungarian communities in Slovakia